Eleocharis geniculata is a species of spikesedge known by several common names, including bent spikerush and Canada spikesedge. This is a widespread plant of wet areas in the Americas, Asia, Africa, Australia, Madagascar, and some Pacific Islands. It is an annual spikesedge growing to a maximum height of about 40 centimeters. It has a few straw-colored leaves and many thin erect stems. The stems hold inflorescences of rounded spikelets each containing at least 10 tiny flowers. The flowers are covered with dark greenish-brown bracts. The fruit is a shiny purple-brown achene not more than a millimeter long.

References

External links
Jepson Manual Treatment
USDA Plants Profile
Photo gallery

geniculata
Flora of North America
Flora of Australia
Flora of Asia
Flora of Africa
Flora of South America
Flora of Madagascar
Flora of the Pacific
Plants described in 1753
Taxa named by Carl Linnaeus